Tetrafluoroberyllate or orthofluoroberyllate  is an anion containing beryllium and fluorine. The fluoroanion has a tetrahedral shape, with the four fluorine atoms surrounding a central beryllium atom. It has the same size and outer electron structure as sulfate. Therefore, many compounds that contain sulfate have equivalents with tetrafluoroberyllate. Examples of these are the langbeinites, and Tutton's salts.

Properties
The Be–F bond length is between 145 and 153 pm. The beryllium has sp3 atomic hybridization, leading to a longer bond than in BeF2, where the Be is sp hybridized. In trifluoroberyllates, there are actually BeF4 tetrahedra arranged in a triangle, so that three fluorine atoms are shared on two tetrahedra each, resulting in a formula of Be3F9.

In the tetrafluoroberyllates, the tetrahedra can rotate to various degrees. At room temperature, they are hindered from moving.

Similar formula compounds have magnesium or zinc in a similar position to beryllium, e.g. K2MgF4 (magnesium tetrafluoride) or (NH4)2ZnF4 (tetrafluorozincate) but these are not as stable.

Tetrafluoroberyllate has a biological effect by inhibiting F-ATPase ATP producing enzymes in mitochondria and bacteria. It does this by attempting to react with adenosine diphosphate because it resembles phosphate. However once it does this it remains stuck in the F1 part of the enzyme and inhibits it from further function.

Simple salts

Sodium tetrafluoroberyllate has several crystalline forms. Below 220 °C it takes the same form as orthorhombic olivine, and this is called γ phase. Between 220 °C and 320 °C it is in the α′ form. When temperature is raised above 320 °C it changes to the hexagonal α form. When cooled the α′ form changes to β form at 110 °C and this can be cooled to 70 °C before changing back to the γ form. It can be formed by melting sodium fluoride and beryllium fluoride. The gas above molten sodium tetrafluoroberyllate contains BeF2 and NaF gas.

Lithium tetrafluoroberyllate takes on the same crystal form as the mineral phenacite. As a liquid it is proposed for the molten salt reactor, in which it is called FLiBe. The liquid salt has a high specific heat, similar to that of water. The molten salt has a very similar density to the solid. The solid has continuous void channels through it, which reduces its density. Li2BeF4 can be crystallised from aqueous solution using (NH4)2BeF4 and LiCl.

Potassium tetrafluoroberyllate has the same structure as anhydrous potassium sulfate, as does rubidium and caesium tetrafluoroberyllate. Potassium tetrafluoroberyllate can make solid solutions with potassium sulfate. It can be used as a starting point to make the non-linear optic crystal KBe2BO3F2 which has the highest power handling capacity and shortest UV performance of any borate. It is quite soluble in water, so beryllium can be extracted from soil in this form.

Ammonium tetrafluoroberyllate decomposes on heating by losing NH4F vapour, progressively forming NH4BeF3, then NH4Be2F5 and finally BeF2.

Thallium tetrafluoroberyllate can be made by dissolving beryllium fluoride and thallium carbonate together in hydrofluoric acid and then evaporating the solution.

Radium tetrafluoroberyllate is used as a standard neutron source. The alpha particles from the radium cause neutrons to be emitted from the beryllium. It is precipitated from a radium chloride solution mixed with potassium tetrafluoroberyllate.

Magnesium tetrafluoroberyllate can be precipitated from a hot saturated solution of ammonium tetrafluoroberyllate and a magnesium salt. However, if the temperature reaches boiling point MgF2 is precipitated instead.

Calcium tetrafluoroberyllate resembles zircon in the way it melts and crystallises.

Strontium tetrafluoroberyllate can be made in several forms. The γ form is produced by cooling a melt of SrF2 and Be2 and the β form is made by precipitating from a water solution. When melted and heated to 850–1145 °C, Be2 gas evaporates leaving behind molten SrF2.

The barium tetrafluoroberyllate is very insoluble and can be used for gravimetric analysis of beryllium.

H2BeF4 is an acid that can be produced from Ag2BeF4 and HCl. It only exists in aqueous solution.

Triglycine tetrafluoroberyllate (TGFB) is ferroelectric with a transition point of 70 °C. The crystals can be formed by dissolving BeF2 in water, adding HF and then glycine. When the solution is cooled triglycine tetrafluoroberyllate forms. Cs2BeF4 and Tl2BeF4 in the solution reduce growth on the 001 direction so that tabular shaped crystals of TGFB form. The thallium compound can cut growth on the 001 axis by 99%.

Double salts

Tuttons salts
The Tuttons salt (NH4)2Mn(BeF4)2·6(H2O) is made from a solution of NH4BeF3 mixed with NH4MnF3.
The equivalent of alums are hard to make because the trivalent ion will often form a complex with fluoride in preference to the beryllium fluoride. However the violet coloured acid and rubidium chrome alum exist at chilly temperatures for a few hours.

Tutton's salts (also called schoenites) containing magnesium with fluoroberyllate are difficult to produce, as the solutions tend to precipitate insoluble MgF2.

Alums
Tetrafluoroberyllate salts equivalent to alums also exist with formula MABF4·12H2O, where M is univalent, and A trivalent. These are not common as fluoride often form insoluble products with the trivalent ions. Methods to produce these include evaporating mixed fluoride solutions under reduced pressure at 0 °C, or dissolving beryllium and other metal hydroxides in hydrofluoric acid at room temperature, cooled, and them mixing with cold ethyl alcohol, causing cooling and crystallisation. The unit cell dimensions are slightly smaller (by 0.03–0.05 Å) than the corresponding sulfate alums.

References

Beryllium compounds
Fluorine compounds
Anions
Fluorometallates